is a dam in Akitakata, Hiroshima Prefecture, Japan.

References 

Dams in Hiroshima Prefecture
Dams completed in 1974
Gōnokawa River